Aberffraw is a village and community on the south west coast of the Isle of Anglesey, in Wales, by the west bank of the Afon Ffraw (Ffraw River). The community includes Soar and Dothan. Located near the A4080 and the nearest rail station is Bodorgan.

History
In the early Middle Ages, Aberffraw was the capital of the Kingdom of Gwynedd from c.860 AD until c.1170. Under the House of Aberffraw it came to be the most important political centre in medieval Wales. The Llys remained the symbolic throne of the Kings of Gwynedd from the 9th century to the 13th century. The Royal Annals of Edward I of England show the Llys was dismantled in 1315 to provide building materials for nearby Beaumaris Castle.

...appeared to demonstrate the presence of a two-phase, round-angled, rectangular enclosure, at least 70m NNE-SSW, thought to represent a Roman military work, refurnished in the early medieval period as a llys (Princely court) enclosure; although a radio-carbon date centring on the period 27-387AD, appears to support this thesis, the identification of a Roman work is currently out of favour: the site of the llys, whose (partial?) dismantling is recorded in 1317, is regarded as uncertain: two sculptured heads, of apparent C13 style, are known from the village (White 1978): the putative curving angle of the enclosure has been suggested to hint at the former presence of a motte: excavations at the traditional site of the llys, about 650m to the WSW, recorded only C18 remains.  Excavation, 1973-4 (White 1979).

Aberffraw village

At the 2011 census, Aberffraw had a population of 620, of which 67.5% speak Welsh. Attractions near Aberffraw village include Llyn Coron, Barclodiad y Gawres, a neolithic burial chamber and the tidal island of Cribinau with church of Saint Cwyfan perched on top. The church still holds services in the summer and is sometimes used for weddings.  The village has a sandy beach, which was awarded the Blue flag rural beach award in 2005, and is on the Anglesey Coastal Path. There is a post office in the village. St Beuno's Church, Aberffraw, dates from the 12th century and is a Grade II* listed building. The village also has an association football team. The village school, Ysgol Aberffraw, closed in 2011.

Governance
Until the 2012 Isle of Anglesey electoral boundary changes an electoral ward in the same name existed. This ward also included part of the community of Llanfaelog. The total population was 1,370. Since the boundary changes Aberfrraw has been part of a larger Bro Aberffraw ward which elects two county councillors to the Isle of Anglesey County Council.

Demographics
Aberffraw's population was 620, according to the 2011 census; a 1.97% increase since the 608 people noted in 2001.

The 2011 census showed 67.5% of the population could speak Welsh, a fall from 80.8% in 2001.

In mythology
In Welsh mythology, Aberffraw features as the site of Branwen and Matholwch's wedding festival, where Efnysien maimed Matholwch's horses.

Notes

Further reading 
Davies, John. A History of Wales.

External links

 A Vision of Britain Through Time
 British Listed Buildings
 
 Geograph
 Office for National Statistics
 Ysgol Aberffraw

 
Former wards of Anglesey